Following is a list of referendums held in the Falkland Islands:

1986 Falkland Islands status referendum
2001 Falkland Islands electoral system referendum
2011 Falkland Islands electoral system referendum
2013 Falkland Islands sovereignty referendum
2020 Falkland Islands electoral system referendum

Falkland Islands referendums